Lingenfelder v. Wainwright Brewing Co., 15 S.W. 844 (1891), was a case decided by the Supreme Court of Missouri that held that forgoing a suit for damages for lack of performance on a contract does not constitute consideration for a modification of that contract.

Decision
The defendant had contracted to design and supervise the construction of a building for the plaintiff.  The defendant refused to complete the project unless he was paid more money, and instead of suing for damages the plaintiff paid the money.  The court struck down the modification of the contract because it lacked consideration.

References

External links

United States contract case law
1891 in United States case law
Missouri state case law
1891 in Missouri